Nevena Veinović is a politician in Serbia. She has served in the National Assembly of Serbia since 2020 as a member of the Serbian Progressive Party.

Private career
Veinović has a Bachelor of Laws degree and lives in the village of Ljutovo in Subotica. From 2019 to 2020, she was a member of the council of the Technical College of Vocational Studies in Subotica.

Politician
Veinović has served on the legal team of the Progressive Party's municipal board in Subotica. She was given the 151st position on the Progressive Party's Aleksandar Vučić — For Our Children list in the 2020 Serbian parliamentary election and was elected when the list won a landslide majority with 188 out of 250 mandates. She is a member of the assembly committee on constitutional and legislative issues; a deputy member of the committee on the judiciary, public administration, and local self-government; a deputy member of the committee on spatial planning, transport, infrastructure, and telecommunications; the head of Serbia's parliamentary friendship group with Cape Verde; and a member of the parliamentary friendship groups with Bosnia and Herzegovina, Croatia, Greece, Hungary, Montenegro, Russia, Switzerland, the United Arab Emirates, and Ukraine.

References

1996 births
Living people
Politicians from Subotica
Members of the National Assembly (Serbia)
Serbian Progressive Party politicians
Women members of the National Assembly (Serbia)